The 1995 CompUSA Florida Citrus Bowl, part of the 1994 bowl game season, took place on January 2, 1995, at the Florida Citrus Bowl in Orlando, Florida. The competing teams were the Alabama Crimson Tide, representing the Southeastern Conference (SEC), and the Ohio State Buckeyes of the Big Ten Conference (Big Ten). Alabama was victorious in by a final score of 24–17. This was the 49th Citrus Bowl played.

Teams

Alabama

The 1994 Alabama squad finished the regular season undefeated and as champions of the SEC Western Division, only to lose to Florida in the SEC Championship Game by one point to finish with an 11–1 record. Following their loss against Florida, the Crimson Tide accepted an invitation to play in the Florida Citrus Bowl as the SEC runner-up. The appearance marked the first for Alabama in the Florida Citrus Bowl, and their 47th overall bowl game.

Ohio State

The 1994 Ohio State squad finished the regular season with losses to Washington, Illinois and Penn State to finish with a record of 9–3. Following their victory over Michigan to end a seven-game losing streak against their rival, the Buckeyes clinched a spot in the Florida Citrus Bowl as Big Ten runner-up. Their appearance marked the third for Ohio State in the Florida Citrus Bowl, and their 27th overall bowl game.

Game summary
The first quarter was scoreless, with Ohio State missing a field goal and Alabama having one blocked. Play was briefly interrupted at one point by a dog that had wandered on the field. In the second quarter Alabama reached the endzone on a nine-yard Tarrant Lynch touchdown run to cap a 16 play, 80 yard drive and take a 7–0 lead. Ohio State responded with a pair of Joey Galloway touchdown receptions. With each coming from quarterback Bobby Hoying, the first was good from 69 yards and the second from 11 to give the Buckeyes a 14–7 lead. The Crimson Tide tied the game just before the half when Sherman Williams scored from seven yards out to knot the game at 14–14. After a scoreless third, each team hit a field goal to bring the score to 17–17. Alabama scored the game-winning touchdown with only 0:42 remaining in the game when Jay Barker hit Williams for a 50-yard touchdown reception and a 24–17 Crimson Tide victory.  The halftime show that day was a real spectacle, having over 2,000 cheerleaders and baton twirlers from all over the nation performing for the crowd.

References

Florida Citrus Bowl
Citrus Bowl (game)
Alabama Crimson Tide football bowl games
Ohio State Buckeyes football bowl games
Florida Citrus Bowl
Florida Citrus Bowl